Ryan Dalton Helsley (born July 18, 1994) is an American professional baseball pitcher for the St. Louis Cardinals of Major League Baseball (MLB). He made his MLB debut in 2019.

Born and raised in Tahlequah, Oklahoma, Helsley played two years of college baseball at Northeastern State University before he was selected by the Cardinals in the fifth round of the 2015 MLB draft. He played in their minor league system before making his debut in 2019. He broke out in 2022 while serving as the team's closer and was named an All-Star.

Amateur career
Helsley attended Sequoyah High School in Tahlequah, Oklahoma, where he played baseball, basketball, and football along with running track. Undrafted out of high school in the 2013 MLB draft, he enrolled at Northeastern State University where he played college baseball. In 2014, as a freshman, he went 7–4 with a 4.60 ERA in 14 games (nine starts) and was named the MIAA Freshman of the Year. As a sophomore, he pitched to a 14–8 record and 4.06 ERA in  innings pitched. After his sophomore season, he was drafted by the St. Louis Cardinals in the fifth round of the 2015 MLB draft and he signed.

Professional career
After signing, Helsley made his professional debut with the Johnson City Cardinals and spent all of 2015 there, posting a 2.01 ERA in  innings. In 2016, he pitched for the Peoria Chiefs, where he posted a 10–2 record with a 1.61 ERA in 17 starts and was named a Midwest League All-Star. Helsley started 2017 with the Palm Beach Cardinals and after going 8–2 with a 2.69 ERA in 17 games (16 starts), he was promoted to the Springfield Cardinals in July. In six starts for Springfield, he was 3–1 with a 2.67 ERA. He also made one start for the Memphis Redbirds at the end of the season. Following the season, he was named the Florida State League Pitcher of the Year. Helsley began 2018 with Springfield and was promoted to Memphis during the season. However, shoulder fatigue ended his season in June. In seven starts for Springfield he was 3–2 with a 4.39 ERA, and in five starts for Memphis he pitched to a 2–1 record and a 3.71 ERA. The Cardinals added Helsley to their 40-man roster after the 2018 season.

Helsley began 2019 back with Memphis. On April 16, he was recalled to the major leagues for the first time. He made his debut that night, throwing two and a third innings in relief and recording a single in his first major league at bat. Helsley was placed on the injured list on June 13 with right shoulder impingement, and was reassigned to Memphis following his activation on July 3. Helsley was recalled for the final time on August 4, spending the remainder of his 2019 regular season in St. Louis' bullpen. Over  relief innings with the Cardinals, Helsley went 2–0 with a 2.95 ERA, striking out 32. In that year's postseason, Helsley pitched  innings with no earned runs and 8 strikeouts.

Helsley began the 2020 season with St. Louis. On August 7, it was announced he had tested positive for COVID-19. Helsley finished the pandemic-shortened season with a 1–1 record, 5.25 ERA and one save in 12 innings of work. In 2021, Helsley appeared in 51 games with the Cardinals in which he went 6-4 with a 4.56 ERA and 47 strikeouts over  innings before he was shut down in mid-August with knee and elbow injures.

In 2022, Helsley compiled a first-half 5–1 record with a 0.73 ERA, 54 strikeouts, and seven saves over 37 innings, and was consequently selected to represent the Cardinals at the All-Star Game in Los Angeles. On September 16, Helsley pitched an immaculate inning against the Cincinnati Reds striking out Kyle Farmer, Jake Fraley, and Donovan Solano in the ninth inning. Helsley finished the 2022 season with 54 relief appearances in which he went 9-1 with a 1.25 ERA, 94 strikeouts, and 19 saves over  innings. In the post-season, Helsley, who had jammed fingers on his throwing hand in his final regular-season appearance, was the loser in Game 1 of the 2022 National League Wild Card Series, allowing a single, two walks, and a hit batter in successive 9th-inning plate appearances for four earned runs in a game the Philadelphia Phillies won 6-3.

Personal life
Helsley is a Christian. Helsley and his wife, Alex, married in July 2021. Their first child, a daughter, was born in August 2022.

Helsley is a citizen of the Cherokee Nation and has some ability to speak the Cherokee language. He grew up a Cardinals fan.

References

External links

1994 births
Living people
Sportspeople from Oklahoma
Baseball players from Oklahoma
Major League Baseball pitchers
Northeastern State RiverHawks baseball players
St. Louis Cardinals players
National League All-Stars
Johnson City Cardinals players
Peoria Chiefs players
Palm Beach Cardinals players
Springfield Cardinals players
Memphis Redbirds players
Cherokee Nation sportspeople
Native American sportspeople
21st-century Native Americans